A Sailor's Heart is a 1912 American short silent comedy film directed by Wilfred Lucas and starring Blanche Sweet.

Cast
 Wilfred Lucas as The False Husband
 Blanche Sweet as The Wife
 Charles Gorman as The Suitor
 Claire McDowell as The Second Wife
 Robert Harron as On Porch (unconfirmed)
 J. Jiquel Lanoe as On Porch
 Charles Hill Mailes as On Porch
 Bess Meredyth as On Porch
 W. Chrystie Miller as The Minister (unconfirmed)
 Charles West as On Street

See also
 Blanche Sweet filmography

References

External links

1912 films
American silent short films
American black-and-white films
1912 comedy films
Films directed by Wilfred Lucas
1912 short films
Silent American comedy films
American comedy short films
1910s American films